The first cabinet of Ivan Silayev was the composition of the Council of Ministers of the Russian Soviet Federative Socialist Republic in office from July 1990 to July 1991.

It was formed shortly after the election of the 12th Supreme Soviet of Russia by the Congress of People's Deputies and subsequent resignation of Alexander Vlasov's Cabinet. Also, the government reform was held at the time, which placed Chairman of the Supreme Soviet as the head of state in the RSFSR, dissolving the Presidium. Vlasov lost the chairman election to Boris Yeltsin, who would become the first President of Russia a year later. After his inauguration on 10 July 1991 Silayev's first cabinet resigned.

Composition

References

Sources 
 
 
 

Russian governments
Silayev
Silayev